Ram Krishna may refer to:

 Ram Krishna (politician), Indian politician from the state of the Madhya Pradesh
 Ram Krishna Dhakal (born 1974), pop and playback singer, actor and reality show judge from Nepal
 Ram Krishna Tamrakar, Nepalese politician